Heterotheca oregona is a species of flowering plant in the family Asteraceae known by the common name Oregon false goldenaster. It is native to the west coast of Canada and the United States in British Columbia, Washington, Oregon, and California as far south as Los Angeles County.

Description
Heterotheca oregona is found in low-elevation mountain forests and chaparral, often near water. This is a perennial herb which is variable in appearance, with four somewhat indistinct varieties. It reaches a maximum height of 20 centimeters (8 inches) to one meter (40 inches), and is covered in small bristles. The inflorescence contains 1-15 flower heads in a flat-topped array. Each head has 14-60 yellowish disc florets but no ray florets. The fruit is an achene with a long grayish pappus.

Varieties
Heterotheca oregona var. compacta (D.D.Keck) Semple from Monterey County to Siskiyou County
Heterotheca oregona var. oregona  - Washington, Oregon, California as far south as Monterey County 
Heterotheca oregona var. rudis (Greene) Semple - Oregon, California as far south as San Benito County and Amador County
Heterotheca oregona var. scaberrima (A.Gray) Semple  from Glenn County to San Luis Obispo County

References

External links
Jepson Manual Treatment
United States Department of Agriculture Plants Profile
Calphotos Photo gallery, University of California

Flora of British Columbia
Flora of California
Flora of Oregon
Flora of Washington (state)
oregona
Plants described in 1841